Danggali  may refer to:

Danggali Conservation Park, a protected area in South Australia	
Danggali, South Australia, a locality
Danggali Wilderness Protection Area, a protected area in South Australia
Danggali people
Danggali language